Ivegill is a small village in the Eden district, Cumbria, England. The village has one place of worship and a school. It is located on an unclassified road near Southwaite services which is on the M6 motorway. It takes its name from the River Ive which flows through the centre of the village. Nearby settlements include the villages of Southwaite, Low Braithwaite, Middlesceugh and Highbridge.

See also

Listed buildings in Skelton, Cumbria

References

External links
Cumbria County History Trust: Dalston (nb: provisional research only – see Talk page)

Villages in Cumbria
Eden District
Inglewood Forest